The Centennial Hall, formerly named Hala Ludowa ("People's Hall"), is a historic building in Wrocław, Poland. It was constructed according to the plans of architect Max Berg in 1911–1913, when the city was part of the German Empire. Max Berg designed Centennial Hall to serve as a multifunctional structure to host "exhibitions, concerts, theatrical and opera performances, and sporting events". The hall continues to be used for sporting events, business summits, and concerts.

As an early landmark of reinforced concrete architecture, the building became one of Poland's official national Historic Monuments (Pomnik historii), as designated 20 April 2005, together with the Four Domes Pavilion, the Pergola, and the Iglica. Its listing is maintained by the National Heritage Board of Poland. It was also listed as a UNESCO World Heritage Site in 2006.

History
It was in the Silesian capital of Breslau where, on 10 March 1813, King Frederick William III of Prussia called upon the Prussian people his proclamation An Mein Volk ("To My People") to rise up against Napoleon's occupation. In this proclamation king Frederick created also the Iron Cross award, which later became the most famous German military honor and symbol. In October of that year, Napoleon was defeated at the Battle of Leipzig.

The opening of the hall was part of the celebration commemorating the 100th anniversary of the battle, hence the name Jahrhunderthalle. Breslau's municipal authorities had vainly awaited state funding and ultimately had to defray the enormous costs out of their own pockets. The landscaping and buildings surrounding the hall were laid out by Hans Poelzig and were opened on 20 May 1913 in the presence of Crown Prince William of Hohenzollern. The grounds include a huge pond with fountains enclosed by a huge concrete pergola in the form of half an ellipse. Beyond this, to the north, a Japanese garden was created. The Silesian author Gerhart Hauptmann had specially prepared a play Festspiel in deutschen Reimen for the occasion, however, the mise-en-scène by Max Reinhardt was suspended by national-conservative circles for its antimilitaristic tendencies.

After the memorial events, the building served as a multi-purpose recreational building, situated in the Exhibition Grounds, previously used for horse racing. It was largely spared from devastation during the Siege of Breslau in World War II. After the war, when the city (together with most of historical Silesia) had become part of the Republic of Poland according to the 1945 Potsdam Agreement, the hall was renamed Hala Ludowa ("People's Hall") by the communist authorities. The hall was extensively renovated in 1997 and in 2010. Recently the Polish translation of the original German name, Hala Stulecia, became official.

Centennial Hall hosted EuroBasket 1963 and a preliminary round group of the EuroBasket 2009 tournament.

Following the renovation in 2009–11, the arena can now hold 10,000 people. In October 2014, the building received a $200,000 renovation grant from the Getty Foundation, as part of the Keeping It Modern grant program that was created a month earlier by the American foundation.

Architecture

The symmetrical quatrefoil shape with a  large circular central space seats 7,000 persons. The Jahrhunderthalle became a key reference for the development of reinforced concrete structures in the 20th century.

At the centre of the structure a superior dome with lantern is situated. Looking from the inside, there is a clearly visible pattern of the Iron Cross at the top of the dome; for this reason the centre of the structure was shrouded during the Communist era in Poland.

Organs 

The hall was originally provided with a Sauer pipe organ built by Walcker Orgelbau, which then, with 15,133 pipes and 200 stops, ranked as the world's largest. On 24 September 1913, Karl Straube was the first to play it, performing Max Reger's Introduction, Passacaglia and Fugue, Op. 127, specially composed to celebrate the occasion. Most parts of the organ were transferred to the rebuilt Wrocław Cathedral after World War II.

Additional registers:
Handregistierung,
Freie Kombination 1,
Freie Kombination 2,
Freie Kombination 3,
Freie Kombination I,
Freie Kombination II,
Freie Kombination III,
Freie Kombination IV,
Freie Kombination V,
Freie Kombination P,
Walze (Crescendo) I – III und Pedal,
Tutti mit Fernorgel,
Tutti ohne Fernorgel,
Fortissimo,
Forte,
Mezzoforte,
Piano,
Tutti I,
Tutti II,
Tutti III,
Tutti IV,
Tutti V,
Tutti P,
Forte I,
Forte II,
Forte III,
Forte V,
Forte P,
Mezzoforte I,
Mezzoforte II,
Mezzoforte III,
Mezzoforte IV,
Mezzoforte V,
Mezzoforte P,
Piano I,
Piano II,
Piano III,
Piano V,
Piano P,
Pianissimo P,
Tuttikoppel,
Generalkoppel,
Flöten I,
Flöten II,
Flöten III,
Prinzipale I,
Prinzipale II,
Prinzipale III,
Gamben I,
Gamben II,
Gamben III,
Rohrwerk,
Rohrwerk I,
Rohrwerk II,
Rohrwerk III,
Rohrwerk IV,
Rohrwerk V,
Rohrwerk P,
Ferpedal an,
Handregister ab,
Handregister I ab,
Handregister II ab,
Handregister III ab,
Handregister IV ab,
Handregister V ab,
Handregister P ab,
Handregister Fr. K. ab,
Handregister Fr. K. I ab,
Handregister Fr. K. II ab,
Handregister Fr. K. III ab,
Handregister Fr. K. IV ab,
Handregister Fr. K. V ab,
Handregister Fr. K. P ab,
Walze (Crescendo) ab,
Rohwerke ab,
Rohwerke I ab,
Rohwerke II ab,
Rohwerke III ab,
Rohwerke IV ab,
Rohwerke V ab,
Rohwerke P ab,
16' ab,
16' I ab,
16' II ab,
16' III ab,
16' IV ab,
16' V ab,
HD ab,
HD I ab,
HD II ab,
Pedalkoppeln ab,
I ab,
P ab,
P I – IV ab,
Automatische Pedal – umschaltung V,
Schwelltritt II,
Schwelltritt III,
Schwelltritt IV,
Schwelltritt V.

Access
The hall lies east of the city centre, but can easily be reached by tram or bus.

The hall features a Visitor Centre open from Thursday to Sunday between 10 am and 6 pm for a small entrance fee.

The building and surroundings is frequently visited by tourists and locals. It lies close to other popular tourist attractions, such as the Wrocław Zoo, the Japanese Garden, and the Pergola with its Multimedia Fountain.

See also 

 List of indoor arenas in Poland
 Sport in Poland
 Monument to the Battle of the Nations

References

Literature

 Erich A. Franz: Die Jahrhunderthalle. In: Bei uns in Breslau. Dülmen 1983, S. 32.
 Jerzy Ilkosz, Beate Störtkuhl (Hrsg.): Hans Poelzig in Breslau. Architektur und Kunst 1900–1916. Aschenbeck, Delmenhorst 2000.
 Jerzy Ilkosz: Die Jahrhunderthalle und das Ausstellungsgelände in Breslau. Das Werk Max Bergs. München 2006, .
 Ernest Niemczyk: Hala Ludowa we Wrocławiu. Wydawn. Politechniki Wrocławskiej, Wrocław 1997, . (mit deutschsprachiger Zusammenfassung)
 Helmut Sauer: Die Jahrhunderthalle zu Breslau. Historische Reminiszenzen. (hrsg. von der Vereinigung ehemaliger Angehöriger der Gerhart-Hauptmann-Oberrealschule zu Breslau) (= Die Grüne Reihe, Heft 16.) Selbstverlag A. Zappel, Leverkusen 2000.
 Gerhard Scheuermann: Das Breslau-Lexikon, Band 1. Laumann-Verlag, Dülmen 1994, S. 667–669.
 Günther Trauer, Willy Gehler: Die Jahrhunderthalle in Breslau. Berechnung, Konstruktion und Bauausführung. Sonderdruck aus Armierter Beton, Jahrgänge 1913 und 1914.
 Ferdinand Werner: Der lange Weg zum neuen Bauen. Band 1: Beton: 43 Männer erfinden die Zukunft. Wernersche Verlagsgesellschaft, Worms 2016. , S. 334–340.

External links

 Official site 
 
 archINFORM - Centennial Hall
 Videomapping
 Hala Stulecia (dawniej Hala Ludowa) - Jahrhunderthalle na portalu polska-org.pl (in Polish)

 

Buildings and structures in Wrocław
Indoor arenas in Poland
Buildings and structures completed in 1913
Sport in Wrocław
Sports venues in Lower Silesian Voivodeship
Tourist attractions in Wrocław
World Heritage Sites in Poland
Basketball venues in Poland
Volleyball venues in Poland
Art Nouveau architecture in Wrocław
Expressionist architecture
1913 establishments in Germany
Boxing venues in Poland
Mixed martial arts venues in Poland